Malda Railway High School is higher secondary school with arts and science.

Establishment 
The school was established in 1966.

Location 
It is situated at the Railway Type1 Colony, P.O.-Jhaljhalia, Dist:Malda of English Bazar municipality of Malda district, India.

Railway support
In 2018, Indian Railways announced its intent to withdraw support for its Railway Schools after 2018–19. Later, it revised its position, announcing support for schools with fifteen to twenty wards of railway employees.

See also
Education in India
List of schools in India
Education in West Bengal

References

External links 

Schools in Malda district
Railway schools in India
Educational institutions established in 1966
1966 establishments in West Bengal